The 16th Golden Raspberry Awards were held on March 24, 1996, at the Hollywood Roosevelt Hotel to recognize the worst the movie industry had to offer in 1995. For the first time in Razzie history, an actual "winner" showed up to the ceremony and accepted his award: Showgirls director Paul Verhoeven.

Awards and nominations

Films with multiple nominations 
These films garnered multiple nominations:

See also

 1995 in film
 68th Academy Awards
 49th British Academy Film Awards
 53rd Golden Globe Awards
 2nd Screen Actors Guild Awards

References

 

Golden Raspberry
Golden Raspberry Awards ceremonies
1996 in American cinema
1996 in California
March 1996 events in the United States
Golden Raspberry